The 2022 Sanremo Challenger was a professional tennis tournament played on clay courts. It was the tenth edition of the tournament which was part of the 2022 ATP Challenger Tour. It took place in Sanremo, Italy between 4 and 10 April 2022.

Singles main-draw entrants

Seeds

 1 Rankings are as of 21 March 2022.

Other entrants
The following players received wildcards into the singles main draw:
  Matteo Arnaldi
  Matteo Donati
  Matteo Gigante

The following players received entry from the qualifying draw:
  Edoardo Lavagno
  Matteo Martineau
  Francesco Passaro
  Khumoyun Sultanov
  Valentin Vacherot
  Máté Valkusz

Champions

Singles

  Holger Rune def.  Francesco Passaro 6–1, 2–6, 6–4.

Doubles

  Geoffrey Blancaneaux /  Alexandre Müller def.  Flavio Cobolli /  Matteo Gigante 4–6, 6–3, [11–9].

References

2022 ATP Challenger Tour
2022 in Italian sport
April 2022 sports events in Italy